Willie Murphy Crawford (September 7, 1946 – August 27, 2004) was a professional baseball outfielder. He played with the Los Angeles Dodgers (1964–1975), St. Louis Cardinals (1976), Houston Astros (1977) and Oakland Athletics (1977) of Major League Baseball (MLB). Crawford was born in Los Angeles, California. He batted and threw left-handed. He was the father of former UCLA football player Willie Crawford who graduated from Beverly Hills High School in 1988.

At Fremont High School in Los Angeles, Crawford was All-City in both football (1963) and baseball. Able to run 100 yards in 9.7 seconds, he was a highly recruited to play college football as a running back. Al Campanis signed Crawford for the Dodgers for $100,000 two days after he graduated from high school in 1964. Because of the Bonus Rule in existence at the time, Crawford had to play for the Dodgers' major league team in both 1964 and 1965.

As a major league baseball player, defensively, he played in a shallow manner, so as to cut down on potential Texas leaguers. Crawford's strong arm was able to cut down ambitious baserunners. Also, he was able to get a good jump on the ball and used his full speed to track down deep fly balls.

Career
Crawford debuted on September 16, 1964, at the age of 18. As a rookie, he batted .313 (5-for-16) with three runs, one double, and stole a base. He had a pinch-hit single in Game 1 of the 1965 World Series, when the Dodgers defeated the Minnesota Twins.

On April 7, 1970, Reds pitcher Gary Nolan defeated the Dodgers, 4–0, on a 2-hitter. Both hits were batted by Crawford, in the 4th and 9th innings.

In his best season, 1973, he hit .295, with 14 homers and 66 RBI in 145 games. Then, in 1974, after hitting .295 again with 11 home runs and 61 RBI during the season, he hit .333 and belted a home run against Oakland in the World Series.

Crawford played for the Dodgers through the end of the 1975 season, compiling a .268 average, with 74 home runs and 335 RBIs in a total of 989 games. He was traded to St. Louis in March 1976. He hit .304 in 120 games for the Cardinals with nine home runs and 50 RBIs. He was traded again after the 1976 season. The Cardinals sent Crawford to the San Francisco Giants. He never appeared in a regular-season game with the Giants who dealt him along with Rob Sperring to the Astros for Rob Andrews and cash during spring training on March 26, 1977. He played 42 games for the Astros and 59 games for Oakland Athletics that season, his last in the major leagues.

During his 12-year career, Crawford appeared in 1,210 games and had a .268 batting average with 86 home runs and 419 RBI. His career numbers included 507 runs, 152 doubles, 35 triples, 47 stolen bases, and 431 walks for a .349 on-base percentage. His fielding percentage was .975 at all three outfield positions.

At age 57, Willie Crawford died at his home in Los Angeles, apparently of kidney disease. He was buried in the Forest Lawn – Hollywood Hills Cemetery.

References

External links

Helms Athletic Foundation-Football 1963
 Seventeen-year old Willie Crawford, signing his baseball contract with Los Angeles Dodgers scout Al Campanis, 1964, in Los Angeles Times Photographic Archive (Collection 1429). UCLA Library Special Collections, Charles E. Young Research Library, University of California, Los Angeles.

1946 births
2004 deaths
African-American baseball players
Albuquerque Dodgers players
American expatriate baseball players in Mexico
Arizona Instructional League Dodgers players
Baseball players from Los Angeles
Burials at Forest Lawn Memorial Park (Hollywood Hills)
Deaths from kidney disease
Houston Astros players
Los Angeles Dodgers players
Major League Baseball outfielders
Oakland Athletics players
Rieleros de Aguascalientes players
Santa Barbara Dodgers players
Spokane Indians players
St. Louis Cardinals players
John C. Fremont High School alumni
20th-century African-American sportspeople
21st-century African-American people